Conroy Aircraft was an American aircraft manufacturer founded by John M. Conroy in Goleta, California, in 1968 after he resigned as president of Aero Spacelines. The company imitated Aero Spacelines' success with its Guppy aircraft by converting a Canadair CL-44 to carry oversized cargo as the Conroy Skymonster.

Starting in 1969, the company converted several turboprop aircraft to haul specialty cargo: the Stolifter, based on the Cessna Skymaster; the Turbo Three and the Tri-Turbo-Three, based on the Douglas DC-3, and the Turbo Albatross, based on the Grumman Albatross.

The company was reorganized in 1972 as Specialized Aircraft, and moved to Camarillo Airport in Camarillo, California.

Turbo-Three Corporation

Conroy formed the Turbo-Three Corp. to support his aircraft; Turbo-Three proposed the Conroy Virtus aircraft to NASA for use as a Space Shuttle carrier aircraft, but the design was not taken up. Turbo-Three Corporation ceased operations sometime around the death of Conroy and the FAA's decision in 1979 that the Tri Turbo-Three must be recertified, not certified under the standing DC-3 certification.

References

External links

 aerofiles.com

Defunct aircraft manufacturers of the United States
Companies based in Santa Barbara County, California
Vehicle manufacturing companies established in 1968
Manufacturing companies disestablished in 1972
1968 establishments in California
1972 disestablishments in California
Defunct manufacturing companies based in California